Sody's tree rat (Kadarsanomys sodyi) is a rodent species in the family Muridae that has been recorded only in bamboo forest in Gunung Gede Pangrango National Park, West Java, Indonesia. It is dark brown and has yellow to ochre spots. Its tail is uniform brown. Its long feet indicate that it is adapted to living in trees.

References

Old World rats and mice
Mammals of Indonesia
Mammals described in 1937
Taxonomy articles created by Polbot